Aluminium–scandium alloys (AlSc) are aluminum alloys that consist largely of aluminium (Al) and traces of scandium (Sc) as the main alloying elements. In principle, aluminium alloys strengthened with additions of scandium are very similar to traditional nickel-base superalloys in that both are strengthened by coherent, coarsening resistant precipitates with an ordered L12 structure. But Al–Sc alloys contain a much lower volume fraction of precipitates, and the inter-precipitate distance is much smaller than in their nickel-base counterparts. In both cases however, the coarsening resistant precipitates allow the alloys to retain their strength at high temperatures.

Composition 
The addition of scandium to aluminium limits grain growth in the heat-affected zone of welded aluminium components. This has two beneficial effects: the precipitated  forms smaller crystals than in other aluminium alloys, and the volume of precipitate-free zones at the grain boundaries of age-hardening aluminium alloys is reduced. Scandium is also a potent grain refiner in cast aluminium alloys, and atom for atom, the most potent strengthener in aluminium, both as a result of grain refinement and precipitation strengthening.

The  precipitate is a coherent precipitate that strengthens the aluminum matrix by applying elastic strain fields that inhibit dislocation movement (i.e., plastic deformation). An added benefit of scandium additions to aluminium is that the nanoscale Al3Sc precipitates that give the alloy its strength are coarsening resistant at relatively high temperatures (~350 °C). This is in contrast to typical commercial 2xxx and 6xxx alloys, which quickly lose their strength at temperatures above 250 °C due to rapid coarsening of their strengthening precipitates.

 has an equilibrium L12 superlattice structure exclusive to this system. A fine dispersion of nano scale precipitate can be achieved via heat treatment that can also strengthen the alloys through order hardening. 

Recent developments include the additions of transition metals such as Zr and rare earth metals like Er produce shells surrounding the spherical  precipitate that reduce coarsening. These shells are dictated by the diffusivity of the alloying element and lower the cost of the alloy due to less Sc being substituted in part by Zr while maintaining stability and less Sc being needed to form the precipitate. These have made  somewhat competitive with titanium alloys along with a wide array of applications. The alloy  is as strong as titanium, light as aluminium, and hard as some ceramics. However, titanium alloys, which are similar in lightness and strength, are cheaper and much more widely used.

Additions of erbium and zirconium have been shown to increase the coarsening resistance of Al-Sc alloys to ~400 °C. This is achieved by the formation of a slow-diffusing zirconium-rich shell around scandium and erbium-rich precipitate cores, forming strengthening precipitates with composition . Additional improvements in the coarsening resistance will allow these alloys to be used at increasingly higher temperatures.

Applications 

 The main application of metallic scandium by weight is in aluminium–scandium alloys for minor aerospace industry components. These alloys contain between 0.1% and 0.5% (by weight) of scandium. They were used in the Russian military, specifically the Mikoyan-Gurevich MiG-21 and MiG-29.
 The increased operating temperature of Al-Sc alloys has significant implications for energy efficient applications, particularly in the automotive industry. These alloys can provide a replacement for denser materials such as steel and titanium that are used in 250–350 °C environments, such as in or near engines. Replacement of these materials with lighter aluminium alloys leads to weight reductions which in turn leads to increased fuel efficiencies.
 Some items of sports equipment, which rely on lightweight high-performance materials, have been made with scandium-aluminium alloys, including baseball bats, tent poles and bicycle frames and components. Lacrosse sticks are also made with scandium. 
 The American firearm manufacturing company Smith & Wesson produces semi-automatic pistols and revolvers with frames of scandium alloy and cylinders of titanium or carbon steel.

References

Further reading 
 Dorin, Thomas; Ramajayam, Mahendra; Vahid, Alireza; Langan, Timothy (2018), "Aluminium Scandium Alloys", Fundamentals of Aluminium Metallurgy, Elsevier, pp. 439–494
 Røyset, J.; Ryum, N. (2005-02-01). "Scandium in aluminium alloys". International Materials Reviews. 50 (1): 19–44. doi:10.1179/174328005X14311. ISSN 0950-6608
 Shevchenko, M. O.; Kudin, V. G.; Berezutskii, V. V.; Ivanov, M. I.; Sudavtsova, V. S. (2014-07-01). "Thermodynamic Properties of Al–Sc Alloys". Powder Metallurgy and Metal Ceramics. 53 (3): 243–249. doi:10.1007/s11106-014-9610-6. ISSN 1573-9066